Dystaxia is a genus of beetles in the family Schizopodidae, containing the following species:

 Dystaxia elegans Fall, 1905
 Dystaxia murrayi LeConte, 1866

References

Schizopodidae
Buprestoidea genera